Omsk State Transport University is a university in Omsk, Russia. It was established in 1961.

History
In April 1896, the State Council of the Russian Empire decided to establish the Tomsk Technological Institute (TTI). On October 9, 1900, the TTI began training mechanics and construction engineers. A new school was established in July 1930 in Tomsk from two faculties of Tomsk Polytechnic University as the Siberian Institute of Transport Engineers (SIIT). In 1932, the Novosibirsk Institute of Railway Engineers was created from the track-building faculty, and the SIIT itself was transformed into the Tomsk Electromechanical Institute of Transport Engineers (TEMIIT). In 1961, it was transferred to Omsk and renamed Omsk Institute of Railway Engineers (OmIIT). In 1994, the institute was transformed into an academy and in 1997 gained the status of university.

Structure

Faculties and Institutes 
 Institute of Land Transport Systems
 Institute of Automation, Telecommunications and Information Technologies
 Institute of Electric Transport and Power Supply Systems (IETSE)
 Institute of Management and Economics (CPMM)
 Institute for Advanced Studies and Retraining
 Faculty of Pre-university Training and Vocational Guidance

Branches 
 Taiga Institute of Railway Transport
 Omsk Technical School of Railway Transport
 Omsk Medical School of Railway Transport

Alumni
Karl Vaino, former First Secretary of the Communist Party of Estonia
Sergey Drobotenko, humorist
Sergey Kalinin, ice hockey player
Aleksei Müürisepp, Chairman of the Supreme Soviet of the Estonian SSR from 1961 to 1970.

External links
Website

References

Omsk
Universities in Omsk Oblast
Technical universities and colleges in Russia